Arléa is a French publishing house created in 1986.

Arléa publishes thirty new titles each year, including pocket ones. His catalog contains more than a thousand titles: the great classics of Antiquity (whether Greek, Latin, Hebrew, Sanskrit or Arabic texts), first novels, contemporary translations, travel stories, and history books. Arléa has its own paperback series.

External links 
 Official website

LVMH
Book publishing companies of France
Publishing companies established in 1986